Khibula is a 2017 Georgian historical drama film directed by Giorgi Ovashvili about the first democratically elected President of Georgia - Zviad Gamsakhurdia. The film script has written by Giorgi Ovashvili and Roelof Jan Minneboo. Khibula is co-production of director's company Alamdary Films, Germany's 42 Film, France's Arizona Productions and Kino from Kazakhstan.

Cast
 Lika Babluani as Tatia
 Hossein Mahjoub as Zviad Gamsakhurdia
 Lidia Chilashvili as Nia
 Manuchar Shervashidze as Joto
 Nodar Dzidziguri as Zurab
 Galoba Gambaria as Rati
 Qishvard Manvelishvili as Prime minister
 Zurab Antelava as Shalva

References

External links
 

2017 films
Drama films from Georgia (country)
2010s Georgian-language films
Films directed by Giorgi Ovashvili
2017 drama films